Edward Watson, Viscount Sondes (3 July 1686 – 20 March 1722) of Lees Court, Sheldwich, Kent, and Park Place, London, was a British Whig politician who sat in the House of Commons between 1708 and 1722.

Watson was the eldest son of Lewis Watson, 1st Earl of Rockingham and Catherine Sondes, daughter of George Sondes, 1st Earl of Feversham. He matriculated at Merton College, Oxford on 1 June 1703, aged 16 and travelled abroad to Germany in 1707.

Watson arrived back from Germany in 1708, in time to be elected as a Whig Member of Parliament for Canterbury at the 1708 British general election. He proposed a motion on 25 January 1709 for an address to the Queen that she should consider remarrying. He also supported the naturalization of the Palatines. He was appointed to a committee to draft a bill to limit the time allowed for public mourning, since this  was felt to be having an  adverse effect on Canterbury's silk trade. He also voted for the impeachment of Dr Sacheverell and possibly in consequence he lost his seat at the 1710 British general election. He was returned unopposed as MP for New Romney at a by-election on 20 April 1713. Following his father's elevation as Earl of Rockingham in 1714, he was styled Viscount Sondes. In 1718, he went over to the Opposition and in 1719 he was appointed a Gentleman of the Bedchamber to the Prince of Wales.

He married, on 21 March 1709, Catherine Tufton, eldest daughter of Thomas Tufton, 6th Earl of Thanet in 1709, and had three sons and a daughter:
 Lewis Watson, 2nd Earl of Rockingham, no issue
 Thomas Watson, 3rd Earl of Rockingham, no issue
 Edward Watson, no issue
 Catherine Watson, married Edward Southwell and had issue.

Watson died of consumption at Kensington Gravel Pits 20 March and was buried 31 March 1722 at Rockingham, predeceasing his father by 2 years. In 1729 his widow and her four sisters became co-heiresses to the Barony of Clifford. She died 13 February and was buried 20 February 1734 at Rockingham. The abeyance was terminated in 1734 for the third sister Margaret, wife of Lord Lovel, but following her death without surviving issue in 1775 the barony was restored in favour of Viscount Sondes' grandson, Edward Southwell, 20th Baron Clifford.

References

Sources

1686 births
1722 deaths
British courtesy viscounts
Alumni of Merton College, Oxford
Members of the Parliament of Great Britain for English constituencies
British MPs 1708–1710
British MPs 1713–1715
British MPs 1715–1722
Heirs apparent who never acceded